Xuanzhou District is an urban district of the city of Xuancheng, Anhui Province, People's Republic of China.

Xuanzhou District has jurisdiction over five subdistricts, sixteen towns and eighteen townships.

Administrative divisions
Xuanzhou District is divided to 7 Subdistricts, 14 towns and 5 townships.
Subdistricts

Towns

Townships

Transport
 China National Highway 318
 Xuancheng railway station

References

County-level divisions of Anhui
Xuancheng